Hard Knuckle is a 1988 Australian post-apocalyptic action television film (later released on home video) about a young boy who tries to get a pool player back on track. It was part of the Tomorrow's News series.

It is one of the few films to feature in any detail the Australian pocket billiards game devil's pool (which features a series of upright pins, similar to large dominoes, as targets and obstacles).

References

External links

Australian television films
1988 television films
1988 films
Australian post-apocalyptic films
Cue sports films
1980s English-language films
Films directed by Lex Marinos